Cathalistis is a genus of moths in the family Eriocottidae described by Edward Meyrick in 1917.

Species
 Cathalistis bispinosa Mey, 2011
 Cathalistis orinephela Meyrick, 1917
 Cathalistis secularis (Meyrick, 1918)

Taxonomy
László Anthony Gozmány and Lajos Vári transferred the genus to Psychidae, subfamily Taleporiinae in 1973. Wolfram Mey transferred it to Eriocottidae, subfamily Compsocteninae in 2011.

References

Eriocottidae